Philips Alexander Nijs (27 May 1724 – 22 March 1805) was a Flemish sculptor and court sculptor of Prince Charles Alexander of Lorraine. He was the son of sculptor Adriaan Nijs.

Life and work
Philips Alexander Nijs was born in Temse on 27 May 1724, to sculptor Egidius Adrianus Nijs and Joanna Catharina Van der Beke. He founded the academy Academie ofte Teekenconstkamer in his birthplace Temse in 1776. Charles Alexander of Lorraine appointed him court sculptor in 1759 when he visited Temse. Nijs mentioned this title in his signature and in gilded letters above his door.

Many of his works are no longer known. Prominently present in his work are the bust of Charles of Lorraine and a terracotta statue of the apostle Peter in the Museum Mayer van den Bergh in Antwerp. In the Church of Our Lady in Temse, both his and his father's sculptures can be seen. A wooden sculpture of Charles of Lorraine, hitherto known only from literature, suddenly appeared at an auction at Sotheby's in Paris. It was part of the collection Maréchal Berthier, Prince de Wagram, and was acquired by the King Baudouin Foundation at the auction.

He married in about 1748 to Joanna Maria Peeters, who gave him 4 daughters and 7 sons.

References

 
1724 births
1805 deaths
18th-century Flemish sculptors
People from Temse